This is a list of Kannada films that are scheduled to release in 2023.

Box office collection
The highest-grossing Sandalwood films released in 2023, by worldwide box office gross revenue, are as follows:

January – March

April – June

October – December

Upcoming Films

References

External links 

2023 in Indian cinema
Lists of 2023 films by country or language
2023